was a railway station on the Sankō Line in Gōtsu, Shimane Prefecture, Japan, operated by West Japan Railway Company (JR West). Opened in 1958, the station closed on 31 March 2018 with the closure of the entire Sankō Line.

Lines

Adjacent stations

History
The station opened on 14 July 1958. With the privatization of Japanese National Railways (JNR) on 1 April 1987, the station came under the control of JR West.

On 16 October 2015, JR West announced that it was considering closing the Sanko Line due to poor patronage. On 29 September 2016, JR West announced that the entire line would close on 31 March 2018. The line then closed on 31 March 2018, with an event hosted by JR West.

See also
 List of railway stations in Japan

References

External links
  

Stations of West Japan Railway Company
Railway stations in Japan opened in 1958
Railway stations in Shimane Prefecture
Railway stations closed in 2018